The Aldabra fody (Foudia aldabrana) is a passerine bird in the family Ploceidae. It is endemic to Aldabra Island in the Indian Ocean.

Until recently it was treated as conspecific with the Comoros fody (Foudia eminentissima).
The species is monotypic.

References

Aldabrafody
Aldabra fody
Taxa named by Robert Ridgway
Birds of Seychelles